Naked official refers to Chinese Communist Party officials who stay in mainland China while their spouses and children reside abroad.
The Chinese Ministry of Commerce has reported that from the beginning of reform and opening in 1978 to 2003 about 4,000 corrupt officials left China, taking at least $50 billion out of the country; often spouses and children went first. The government is setting up stricter monitoring systems to decrease the practice. In early 2014, a revision of the rules for the promotion and appointment of senior officials introduced rules that disbarred officials whose spouses live abroad (or if they have no spouse, their children) from promotion

Examples
Pang Jiayu's wife and son emigrated to Canada in 2002. Pang, formerly vice chairman of the provincial committee of the Chinese People's Political Consultative Conference in Shanxi Province, was sentenced in 2008 to a 12-year prison term  for bribery and dereliction of duty.
Zhou Jinhuo's wife had emigrated to the United States, and he tried to join her in  June 2006 while under investigation for corruption. Zhou was formerly director of the Industry and Commerce Bureau of Fujian Province.

See also
Haigui those returned from study abroad
Gireogi appa similar term for Korean fathers

References

External links
Southern Weekly on how to deal with "naked officials"

Economy of China
Politics of China
Society of China
Political corruption
Ideology of the Chinese Communist Party
Political neologisms